Apriona multigranula is a species of beetle in the family Cerambycidae. It was described by Thomson in 1878. It is known from the Philippines.

References

Batocerini
Beetles described in 1878